Ghosts of Goldfield is a 2007 American supernatural horror film directed by Ed Winfield. This film music composed by Steve Yeaman. The film stars Kellan Lutz, Marnette Patterson, Mandy Amano, Scott Whyte, Chuck Zito and Ashly Margaret Rae in the lead roles.

Plot
A group of five led by Julie set up their filming equipment in the hotel of the derelict town of Goldfield, hoping to capture footage of the ghost of Elisabeth Walker, a maid tortured and killed in room 109. Troubled by visions, Julie discovers that a necklace, handed down to her from her grandmother, is somehow connecting her to this tragedy.

Cast

 Kellan Lutz as Chad
 Marnette Patterson as Julie
 Mandy Amano as Keri
 Scott Whyte as Dean
 Chuck Zito as  George Winfield
 Ashly Margaret Rae as Elizabeth Walker
 John Bloom as Clancy
 Teri Corcoran as Can-can dancer
 Roddy Piper as  Jackson Smith
 Richie Chance as Mike

References

External links
 
 

2007 films
2007 horror films
American supernatural horror films
American direct-to-video films
Films shot in Nevada
2000s English-language films
2000s American films